Harold Moore may refer to:

 Harold Moore (metallurgist)  (1878–1972), British metallurgist
 Hal Moore (1922–2017), U.S. Army officer
 Harold E. Moore (1917–1980), American botanist 
 Khalid Abdul Muhammad (born Harold Moore Jr., 1948–2001), American black activist
 Harold Moore, co-founder of the Association of Comics Magazine Publishers

See also
Harry Moore (disambiguation)